Ear Falls Airport  was located  northwest of Ear Falls, Ontario, Canada.

See also
Ear Falls Water Aerodrome

External links
Page about this airport on COPA's Places to Fly airport directory

References

Defunct airports in Ontario
Registered aerodromes in Kenora District